The Route Verte (in English, the "Green Route," or the "Greenway") is a network of bicycling and multiuse trails and designated roads, lanes, and surfaces, spanning  as of October 31, 2013, in the Canadian province of Quebec, inaugurated on August 10, 2007.  The trail network includes both urban trails (for example, in and around the city of Montreal) and cycling routes into quite isolated areas in the north, as well as along both sides of the Saint Lawrence River, out to the Gaspésie region, and on the Îles de la Madeleine, linking more than 320 municipalities along the way. The Route Verte is not entirely composed of trails, as nearly 61% of the network actually consists of on-road surfaces, whether regular roads with little traffic, wide shoulders, special lanes on highways, or otherwise.  The segregated trails are mostly rail trails shared-use with hikers and other users.

Routes

Gallery

See also 
 Bicycle trail 
 Rail trail
 EuroVelo
 United States Numbered Bicycle Routes

References

External links
 Route Verte
 Maps on Openstreetmap

Bike paths in Quebec
Hiking trails in Quebec
Long-distance cycling routes
2007 establishments in Quebec